Philippe Monneret (born 1962)  is a French linguist. He is Professor of Linguistics at University of Burgundy since 2004 and at Paris-Sorbonne University since 2015. In 2003, he founded Les Cahiers de Linguistique Analogique and created the field of analogical linguistics (« linguistique analogique »). He is a member of the editorial board of «Romanica Olomucensia».

Books
Questions de syntaxe française (with René Rioul, PUF, Paris, 1999)
Exercices de linguistique (PUF, Paris, 1999, 2007, 2014)
Notions de linguistique théorique (EUD, Dijon, 2003)
Le sens du signifiant. Implications linguistiques et cognitives de la motivation (Honoré Champion, Paris, 2003)
Essais de linguistique analogique (ABELL, Dijon, 2004)
Cahiers de Linguistique Analogique. 1. Le mot comme signe et comme image. Lieux et enjeux de l'iconicité linguistique (ABELL, Dijon, 2003)
La fonction expressive. Vol. 2 (with Laurent Gautier, PUFC, Besançon, 2010)

Notes

External links
Website
Cahiers de linguistique analogique

See also
Romanica Olomucensia

Linguists from France
French non-fiction writers
French cognitive scientists
Rhetoric theorists
1962 births
Living people
French male writers
Male non-fiction writers